WZWB (1420 AM) is a radio station broadcasting a sports format, licensed to Kenova, West Virginia and serving the Huntington market as the area's affiliate of Fox Sports Radio. 

Until 2022, for all programming other than local sporting events, it was a simulcast of WIRO in nearby Ironton, Ohio. Prior to its current format, the station broadcast a Christian religious format known as Joy Radio and was, until January 2007, simulcast with WZZW of Milton, West Virginia.

External links
WZWB official website

ZWB
Huntington, West Virginia
IHeartMedia radio stations
Radio stations established in 1954
1954 establishments in West Virginia
Fox Sports Radio stations